Cutella is a rural locality in the Toowoomba Region, Queensland, Australia.

History 
The locality takes its name from its railway station named on 12 May 1910 by the Queensland Railways Department with an Aboriginal word meaning eagle.

References 

Toowoomba Region
Localities in Queensland